Tirupati Lok Sabha constituency is one of the twenty-five Lok Sabha constituencies of Andhra Pradesh in India. It comprises seven assembly segments and belongs to Tirupati district.

Assembly segments 
The seven Assembly segments of Tirupati Lok Sabha constituency are:

Members of Parliament

Election results

General elections 1989

General elections 1991

General elections 1996

General elections 1998

General elections 1999

General elections 2004

General elections 2009

General elections 2014

General elections 2019

By-poll 2021

See also 
 List of constituencies of the Andhra Pradesh Legislative Assembly

References

External links 
 Tirupati lok sabha constituency election 2019 date and schedule

Tirupati
Lok Sabha constituencies in Andhra Pradesh
Tirupati district